Masanori Suda (born July 7, 1973) is a Japanese mixed martial artist. He competed in the Welterweight, Middleweight and Heavyweight divisions. Suda is known primarily for his time in Shooto, where he is a former Light Heavyweight Champion. He held the title until his retirement in 2006.

Championships and accomplishments

Mixed martial arts
Lumax Cup
Tournament of J '97 Middleweight Championship (1997)
Shooto
Shooto Light Heavyweight Championship (one time)
Two successful title defenses'
SuperBrawl
SuperBrawl Middleweight Championship (one time)

Sambo
All Japan Sambo Championships
20th All Japan Sambo Championship 82kg class (1994)

Mixed martial arts record

|-
| Loss
| align=center| 22-11-3
| Murilo Bustamante
| Submission (armbar)
| Pride: Bushido 9
| 
| align=center| 1
| align=center| 3:20
| Tokyo, Japan
| 
|-
| Loss
| align=center| 22-10-3
| Falaniko Vitale
| KO (punch)
| SB 39: Destiny
| 
| align=center| 1
| align=center| 4:09
| Honolulu, Hawaii, United States
| 
|-
| Win
| align=center| 22-9-3
| Brian Ebersole
| Submission (rear-naked choke)
| Shooto: 1/29 in Korakuen Hall
| 
| align=center| 3
| align=center| 2:59
| Tokyo, Japan
| 
|-
| Draw
| align=center| 21-9-3
| Dustin Denes
| Draw
| Shooto Hawaii: Soljah Fight Night
| 
| align=center| 3
| align=center| 5:00
| Honolulu, Hawaii, United States
| 
|-
| Win
| align=center| 21-9-2
| Shannon Ritch
| Submission (triangle choke)
| SB 32: SuperBrawl 32
| 
| align=center| 1
| align=center| 1:02
| Honolulu, Hawaii, United States
| 
|-
| Draw
| align=center| 20-9-2
| Ryuki Ueyama
| Draw
| Deep: 12th Impact
| 
| align=center| 3
| align=center| 5:00
| Tokyo, Japan
| 
|-
| Win
| align=center| 20-9-1
| Egan Inoue
| KO (punches)
| SB 29: SuperBrawl 29
| 
| align=center| 1
| align=center| 0:27
| Honolulu, Hawaii, United States
| 
|-
| Win
| align=center| 19-9-1
| Ryo Chonan
| Decision (split)
| Deep: 7th Impact
| 
| align=center| 3
| align=center| 5:00
| Tokyo, Japan
| 
|-
| Win
| align=center| 18-9-1
| Ronald Jhun
| Decision (majority)
| Shooto: Treasure Hunt 7
| 
| align=center| 3
| align=center| 5:00
| Sakai, Osaka, Japan
| 
|-
| Win
| align=center| 17-9-1
| Lance Gibson
| Decision (unanimous)
| Shooto: Treasure Hunt 1
| 
| align=center| 3
| align=center| 5:00
| Tokyo, Japan
| 
|-
| Draw
| align=center| 16-9-1
| Larry Papadopoulos
| Draw
| Shooto: To The Top 7
| 
| align=center| 3
| align=center| 5:00
| Osaka, Japan
| 
|-
| Loss
| align=center| 16-9
| Patrick Fortrie
| Decision
| GT: Golden Trophy 2001
| 
| align=center| 1
| align=center| 5:00
| France
| 
|-
| Loss
| align=center| 16-8
| Akihiro Gono
| Decision (unanimous)
| Shooto: R.E.A.D. 12
| 
| align=center| 3
| align=center| 5:00
| Tokyo, Japan
| 
|-
| Loss
| align=center| 16-7
| Lance Gibson
| Decision (majority)
| Shooto: R.E.A.D. 6
| 
| align=center| 3
| align=center| 5:00
| Tokyo, Japan
| 
|-
| Win
| align=center| 16-6
| Yuki Sasaki
| Decision (unanimous)
| Shooto: R.E.A.D. 3
| 
| align=center| 3
| align=center| 5:00
| Kadoma, Osaka, Japan
| 
|-
| Win
| align=center| 15-6
| Martijn de Jong
| Submission (punches)
| Shooto: Renaxis 5
| 
| align=center| 2
| align=center| 4:44
| Kadoma, Osaka, Japan
| 
|-
| Loss
| align=center| 14-6
| Branden Lee Hinkle
| TKO (upkicks)
| VTJ 1998: Vale Tudo Japan 1998
| 
| align=center| 1
| align=center| 5:26
| Urayasu, Chiba, Japan
| 
|-
| Loss
| align=center| 14-5
| Erik Paulson
| TKO (punches)
| Shooto: Las Grandes Viajes 5
| 
| align=center| 3
| align=center| 4:48
| Tokyo, Japan
| 
|-
| Win
| align=center| 14-4
| Oherian Diarute
| Submission (flying armbar)
| GT: Golden Trophy 1998
| 
| align=center| 2
| align=center| 0:00
| France
| 
|-
| Win
| align=center| 13-4
| Kenji Kawaguchi
| Submission (armbar)
| Shooto: Las Grandes Viajes 2
| 
| align=center| 3
| align=center| 1:08
| Tokyo, Japan
| 
|-
| Win
| align=center| 12-4
| Ray Cooper
| Submission (armbar)
| Shooto: Las Grandes Viajes 1
| 
| align=center| 1
| align=center| 1:55
| Tokyo, Japan
| 
|-
| Win
| align=center| 11-4
| Shunsuke Hayashi
| Submission (heel hook)
| Lumax Cup: Tournament of J '97 Middleweight Tournament
| 
| align=center| 1
| align=center| 1:51
| Japan
| 
|-
| Win
| align=center| 10-4
| Izuru Takeuchi
| Submission (toe hold)
| Lumax Cup: Tournament of J '97 Middleweight Tournament
| 
| align=center| 1
| align=center| 1:53
| Japan
| 
|-
| Win
| align=center| 9-4
| Mitsuhiro Suzuki
| Decision (unanimous)
| Lumax Cup: Tournament of J '97 Middleweight Tournament
| 
| align=center| 2
| align=center| 3:00
| Japan
| 
|-
| Win
| align=center| 8-4
| Kazuhiro Kusayanagi
| Decision (unanimous)
| Shooto: Reconquista 3
| 
| align=center| 3
| align=center| 5:00
| Tokyo, Japan
| 
|-
| Loss
| align=center| 7-4
| Sanae Kikuta
| Submission (armbar)
| Lumax Cup: Tournament of J '97 Heavyweight Tournament
| 
| align=center| 1
| align=center| 3:59
| Japan
| 
|-
| Win
| align=center| 7-3
| Kaichi Tsuji
| Submission (heel hook)
| Lumax Cup: Tournament of J '97 Heavyweight Tournament
| 
| align=center| 1
| align=center| 0:21
| Japan
| 
|-
| Win
| align=center| 6-3
| Ryuta Sakurai
| Submission (armbar)
| Lumax Cup: Tournament of J '97 Heavyweight Tournament
| 
| align=center| 1
| align=center| 4:25
| Japan
| 
|-
| Loss
| align=center| 5-3
| Masato Fujiwara
| Submission (triangle armbar)
| Shooto: Let's Get Lost
| 
| align=center| 1
| align=center| 2:15
| Tokyo, Japan
| 
|-
| Loss
| align=center| 5-2
| Akihiro Gono
| Submission (rear-naked choke)
| Shooto: Free Fight Kawasaki
| 
| align=center| 4
| align=center| 0:33
| Kawasaki, Kanagawa, Japan
| 
|-
| Loss
| align=center| 5-1
| Sanae Kikuta
| Submission (heel hook)
| Lumax Cup: Tournament of J '96
| 
| align=center| 1
| align=center| 1:15
| Japan
| 
|-
| Win
| align=center| 5-0
| Kazunari Murakami
| Submission (armbar)
| Lumax Cup: Tournament of J '96
| 
| align=center| 2
| align=center| 1:38
| Japan
| 
|-
| Win
| align=center| 4-0
| Yuzo Tateishi
| Submission (armbar)
| Lumax Cup: Tournament of J '96
| 
| align=center| 1
| align=center| 1:51
| Japan
| 
|-
| Win
| align=center| 3-0
| Yuichi Otsuka
| Submission (armbar)
| Lumax Cup: Tournament of J '96
| 
| align=center| 1
| align=center| 1:20
| Japan
| 
|-
| Win
| align=center| 2-0
| Isamu Osugi
| Submission (armbar)
| Shooto: Vale Tudo Junction 2
| 
| align=center| 2
| align=center| 2:57
| Tokyo, Japan
| 
|-
| Win
| align=center| 1-0
| Genta Haga
| Technical Submission (armbar)
| Shooto: Vale Tudo Junction 1
| 
| align=center| 1
| align=center| 1:02
| Tokyo, Japan
|

See also
List of male mixed martial artists

References

External links
 
 Masanori Suda at mixedmartialarts.com
 Masanori Suda at fightmatrix.com

1973 births
Japanese male mixed martial artists
Welterweight mixed martial artists
Middleweight mixed martial artists
Heavyweight mixed martial artists
Mixed martial artists utilizing judo
Mixed martial artists utilizing sambo
Living people
Japanese sambo practitioners
Japanese male judoka